Jenefer Shute is an author of four novels: Life-Size, Sex Crimes, Free Fall and User I.D.. She has also written for Harper's, The Nation, salon.com, The Guardian, Tikkun, the Boston Review, and Modern Fiction Studies.

Biography
Born in Johannesburg, South Africa, she currently lives in Hudson, New York. She has a Ph.D in literature from the University of California and was, until recently, a professor at Hunter College of the City University of New York, where she taught in the MFA program in creative writing. She has also taught at Emerson College in Boston, the University of Paris, and the University of Cape Town, where she gained her first degree in English. From 2012 to 2016, she lived in Cape Town and worked as a fiction editor for Penguin Random House, South Africa.

Novels
Life-Size (Houghton Mifflin, 1992)
Sex Crimes (Doubleday, 1996)
Free Fall (Secker & Warburg, 2002)
User I.D. (Houghton Mifflin, 2005)

References

External links

Jenefer shute: On Being a Bad Girl
Audio interview with Jenefer Shute

Living people
Hunter College faculty
People from Johannesburg
University of California alumni
Emerson College faculty
University of Cape Town alumni
Academic staff of the University of Cape Town
South African women novelists
Academic staff of the University of Paris
Novelists from Massachusetts
Novelists from New York (state)
Year of birth missing (living people)
People from Hudson, New York